Colchester South Township was a former incorporated township and is now a geographic township located in Essex County in Southwestern Ontario, Canada. Located on Lake Erie, the incorporated township comprised the towns of Colchester and Harrow. It was amalgamated into the Town of Essex in 1999.

See also
List of townships in Ontario

References

Former township municipalities in Ontario
Communities in Essex County, Ontario